The Fraudulent Conveyances Act 1571 (13 Eliz 1, c 5), also known as the Statute of 13 Elizabeth, was an Act of Parliament in England, which laid the foundations for fraudulent transactions to be unwound when a person had gone insolvent or bankrupt. In the United Kingdom, the provisions contained in the 1571 Act were replaced by Part IX of the Law of Property Act 1925, which has since been replaced by Part XVI of the Insolvency Act 1986.

Text

It is clear from the text of the statute that it was framed in a purposive manner. So if someone had the intention of defrauding a creditor, unless a transaction was made bona fide and for good consideration, it would be void.

Historical background
In 1571, Parliament enacted this statute to prohibit transfers intended to defraud creditors or impede their collection efforts. This statute, known as the Statute of 13 Elizabeth, was passed in response to the widespread use of fraudulent transactions to defeat creditors. Until the 1600s, England had numerous sanctuaries not subject to the King's writ. These sanctuaries included churches but also certain areas defined by custom or royal grant. Debtors would often sell their property to friends or family at unreasonably low prices with the promise of buying it back later, move to a sanctuary, and then wait for creditors to exhaust their efforts or offer a favorable settlement.

Cases under the Act
Alderson v Temple (1768) (1746-1779) 1 Black W 660, 96 ER 384, Lord Mansfield held the Act applied, not just to fraudulent conveyances, but also the granting of fraudulent preferences. He said a ‘fraudulent preference by a debtor, if made on the eve of, and followed by, the bankruptcy of the debtor, has been void against his creditors; because it aims at preventing that equal distribution of assets among the creditors, which has always been the object of those laws.’
Twyne's Case (1601) 3 Coke 80b, 76 ER 809 held that where a debtor tried to transfer title to property to another party but retained possession of it, that was repugnant to the Act.
Ideal Bedding v Holland [1907] 2 Ch 157, where Kekewich J noted that by virtue of subsequent enactments widening the potential relief available to creditors, the Act had come to apply in a wide variety of circumstances which seemed to be wider than the original intended application as there was more potential for an action to constitute a hindrance upon that entitlement to relief.
Trustee of the property of Pehrsson (a bankrupt) v Von Greyerz [1999] 4 LRC 135, in one of the most recent appellate decisions on the Act, the Privy Council heard an appeal relating to the Act from Gibraltar, where the Act still applies.
 Curtis v Price (1806) 12 Ves 89; 33 ER 35; [1803-13] All ER Rep 220
 Ryall v Rolle (1749) 1 Atk 165; 1 Wils 260; 1 Ves Sen 348; 9 Bli NS 377; 26 ER 107; [1558-1774] All ER Rep 82
 Daubeny v Cockburn (1816) 1 Mer 626; 35 ER 801; [1814-23] All ER Rep 604
 Doe d Garnons v Knight (1826) 5 B & C 671; 8 Dow & Ry KB 348; 4 LJOSKB 161; 108 ER 250; [1824-34] All ER Rep 414

Other jurisdictions

United States

Many U.S. states enacted their own versions of the Statute of 13 Elizabeth after the American Revolution.  The Act was later superseded by the Uniform Fraudulent Conveyances Act of 1918 (UFCA), which in turn was superseded by the Uniform Fraudulent Transfer Act of 1984 (UFTA).  To date, UFTA has been enacted in 43 states and the District of Columbia.

Both the Bankruptcy Act of 1938 and the Bankruptcy Reform Act of 1978 also included their own versions of the UFCA, thus ensuring that bankruptcy trustees can "avoid" (in other words, reverse) fraudulent transfers made by the bankrupt person within a certain time window before they filed for bankruptcy.

Commonwealth
The laws of England were incorporated into numerous of the colonies on specified dates. In Western Canada for example, the laws of England were incorporated as the laws of the Northwest Territories (now Saskatchewan, Alberta, the Northwest Territories and Nunavut) as at 1885.  Although most former colonies have passed similar legislation, the 1571 Act may still be in effect in some jurisdictions. All Australian States and Territories and New Zealand received the Statute, and have equivalent provisions.

See also
Fraudulent conveyance
UK insolvency law
Statute of Bankrupts Act 1542
Arbuthnot Leasing International Ltd v Havelet Leasing Ltd (No 2) [1990] BCC 36

External links
Validity of bona fide conveyances by solvent debtors as against prior creditors (1885) American law Register 489

References

Insolvency law of the United Kingdom
1571 in law
1571 in England
Acts of the Parliament of England (1485–1603)
Fraud legislation
Fraud in England